The Estrada de Ferro Oeste de Minas (EFOM) was a  narrow-gauge railway located in the southeastern Brazilian state of Minas Gerais. At its peak the railway's route totalled . A portion of the railway still operates as a heritage railway, and one of the major stations (São João del Rei) is now Brazil's largest railway museum.

History
 railways entered Minas Gerais in the 1870s, pushing towards the city of Belo Horizonte. Almost immediately attention turned to the construction of narrow-gauge feeder lines. In 1872 Provincial President Dr. Joaquim Floriano de Godoy signed into law approval for a narrow-gauge railway from the broad-gauge line heading west towards a navigable point on the Rio Grande. A subsequent law in 1877 limited the railway to initially building only as far as São João del Rei. A company, the Companhia Estrada de Ferro Oeste de Minas, was established in 1878, and a decision was made to make the junction with the broad gauge at Sítio (Antônio Carlos).

The exact reason for the choice of gauge is not known; one theory is that an American engineer was familiar with the Ferrocarril de Antofagasta a Bolivia in Chile. In any case, construction was begun in June 1879, with the first section opening between Sitio and Barrosso in September 1880. The line was opened through to São João del Rei on 28 August 1881 by the Emperor Dom Pedro II.

The company sought permission to extend the railway and over the subsequent 15 years built a number of extensions until it reached Paraopeba. Apart from a small number of short branches, the railway was more or less complete by 1894. During this time the line had been reasonably profitable, returning small dividends. However, in 1894 the railway barely broke even, and following years brought losses. By April 1900 the company was in liquidation, and a month and a half strike by employees was only halted when the State government paid their back pay. The entire railway was placed up for auction on 13 June 1903 and purchased by the Federal Treasury.

Several branches were constructed in the period up to 1923, but no extensions after that date. Operation of the line was divested to the State government in 1931. In the meantime,  had been adopted as the primary gauge for secondary lines in Brazil. Lines radiating to the west from Belo Horizonte crossed the railway at Divinópolis and Velho Dataipa. By 1953, control of the railway reverted to the Federal government. During the period 1960 to 1965 most of the railway was either closed or converted to metre gauge. Only the section from Antônio Carlos to Aureliano Mourão was retained.

The Antônio Carlos line survived mainly on limestone traffic associated with a cement plant. Passenger traffic declined to a single coach attached to a daily mixed train. However, as the 1970s progressed, the line became more popular with tourists, and passenger traffic grew dramatically. In 1983 the closure of the cement plant brought the closure of the majority of the line, with only the section from Tiradentes to São João Del Rei being retained as a tourist line.

Route
The main line route was shaped like an "L". The line headed west from the junction at Antonio Carlos, through São João Del Rei, to Aureliano Mourão. From Aureliano Mourao the line headed north through Divinopolis and Pompeu to the terminal at Paraopeba. A branch ran from Aureliano Mourão south-west to the head of navigation on the Rio Grande at Riberao Vermelho. The sections, with distances and dates of opening and closing, are listed below:

Main line –  total length
 Antônio Carlos – Barroso  1880–1983
 Barroso – Tiradentes  1881–1983
 Tiradentes – São João del Rei  1881–present. Preserved section.
 São João Del Rei – Aureliano Mourão  1883–1983
 Aureliano Mourão – Oliveira  1888–c.1960 metre gauge
 Oliveira – Divinópolis  1890–c.1960 metre gauge
 Divinopolis – São Gonçalo do Pará  1890–1965
 São Gonsalo do Para – Velho Dataipa  1891–1965
 Velho Dataipa – Martinho Campos  1891–1964
 Martinho Campos – Pompéu  1891–1962
 Pompeu – Paraopeba  1894–1960

Branch lines
 Ghagas Doria – Águas Santas  1910–1966
 Aureliano Mourão – Marcaia  1887–c.1960 metre gauge
 Marcaia – Riberao Vermelho  1888–1966
 Riberao Vermelho – Lavras  dual gauge with metre gauge 1908–1965
 Goncalves Ferreira – Itapecerica  1891–c.1960
 Goncalves Ferreira – Claudio  1912–c.1960
 Martinho Campos – Pitanguy  1907–? metre gauge
 Barbacena – Campolide  c.1923–1965

Locomotives
The first two locomotives purchased by the company were from the Baldwin Locomotive Works, and were described as being of the "Montesuma" type. They had a  wheel arrangement, and weighed about 13 tons, plus tender. Further 4-4-0s followed, and as the railway grew also s and s. Some of the larger locomotives were up to about 25 tons in weight. Initially the locomotives used wood as a fuel, however later they were converted to oil.

In all 58 locomotives were built for the railway. Baldwin built all but five, with three being built by American Locomotive Company (ALCo), and two in the railway's own workshops. These included the last locomotive acquired by the railway, a  constructed in 1920. Records indicate this locomotive was built for about half the cost of an imported locomotive, but performed equally well.

Sixteen locomotives survived to the final closure of the railway, and were subsequently preserved, including locomotive number 1.

Rio Grande navigation
The EFOM met the Rio Grande at Riberao Vermelho, from where the railway ran a steam navigation service down the river for 208 km, as far as Capetina. There were six stations on the river between Riberao Vermelho and Capetinga, and a passenger and freight service was operated between 1889 and 1963. The railway operated a fleet of 6 stern-wheel paddle steamers, together with barges and launches.

Preservation and museum
At the time of the final closure in 1983 the railway was attracting increasing numbers of tourists. A decision was made to turn the substantial station, workshops and roundhouse in São João del Rei into a railway museum. Fourteen locomotives, as well as the remaining rolling stock was brought to São João del Rei, together with a number of items of metre gauge equipment. The roundhouse had to be rebuilt after a fire in 1972. The new museum became the largest railway museum in Brazil, and was opened in August 1984.

At the same time a 13 km stretch of track to Tiradentes was retained for the tourist railway operation. Regular passenger trains are operated over this stretch of track, using the original equipment of the railway. Trains are run on Fridays, Saturdays, Sundays, and public holidays. Occasional lineside fires caused by sparks igniting brushwood have been acclaimed as adding to the experience.

References
Waters, P. West of Minas Narrow Gauge 2001. PWA, Kent, UK

External links
 https://web.archive.org/web/20080209141805/http://www.steam.demon.co.uk/trains/brazil35.htm
 http://mikes.railhistory.railfan.net/r020.html
 http://www.narrow-gauge.co.uk/gallery/show.php?image_id=581&cat_id=106
 https://web.archive.org/web/20070717133039/http://www.barkah.org/Travelogues/Brazil/Train/index.html

2 ft 6 in gauge railways in Brazil
Museums in Minas Gerais
Railway museums in Brazil
Heritage railways in Brazil